The Nidau-Büren Canal is a -long canal that drains the waters of the river Aare out of the Lake of Biel/Bienne toward Solothurn. It was dug as an important part of the first Jura water correction.

Regulating dam 

A temporary dam had been built across the Nidau-Büren channel, in order to maintain the water level in the lake.

Of insufficient retaining capacity, another one was erected in 1887 that also showed its limits, especially during a flood in 1910. Soon, the cantons of Vaud, Neuchâtel and Fribourg required its replacement, but it was only modified in 1911 and 1915.

Finally, the building of the new regulating dam was started in Port in 1936, and it was completed and commissioned in 1939 and has been daily in use ever since. The dam includes a  lock that is large enough for tour boats that run between Biel and Solothurn. In 1995 a hydroelectric plant was added to the lock. This plant, located near Brügg produces an average of 25 Million Kilowatt-hours per year.

Canals in Switzerland
Water transport in Switzerland
Canals opened in 1868
CNidau-Buren